Seminole State Park is a 604 acre (2.44 km2) state park located on the shores of Lake Seminole in the extreme southwest corner of Georgia. The park offers excellent fishing opportunities on the lake, as well as a tranquil getaway in one of the park's cottages or campsites. The park also offers a scenic nature trail to experience the forest in the park. The park also offers treehouse camping that sleeps up to fifteen people.  The park recently opened a new group shelter that seats up to two hundred people. The park has a new Facebook page where people can go and see what events or specials are going on at the park.

Facilities
604 Acres 
50 Tent, Trailer, RV Campsites  
14 Cottages  
Lake and Swimming Beach 
5 Picnic Shelters  
Group Shelter (seats 200) 
 Pioneer Campground 
Pioneer Campground  
Gift Shop

External links

Georgia State Parks

State parks of Georgia (U.S. state)
Protected areas of Seminole County, Georgia